The 2007–08 Danish Superliga season was the 18th season of the Danish Superliga league championship, which determined the winners of the Danish football championship. It was governed by the Danish Football Association. It started with the first match on July 18, 2007 and ended with the final match on May 24, 2008.

The Danish champions qualified for UEFA Champions League 2008-09. The runners-up and no. 3 qualified for the UEFA Cup 2008-09. The 4th placed team qualified for the UEFA Intertoto Cup 2008. The 11th and 12th placed teams were relegated to the 1st Division. The 1st Division champions and runners-up are promoted to the Superliga.

Participants

League table

Results
To read this table, the home team is listed in the left-hand column.

Season statistics

Scoring
First goal of the season: Thomas Dalgaard for Randers against Viborg (18 July 2007)
Fastest goal in a match: Søren Friis (18 seconds) for Horsens against Viborg (14 April 2008)
Widest Winning Margin: Viborg 0–5 Esbjerg (22 July 2007) / Midtjylland 5–0 Brøndby (29 July 2007) / Randers 5–0 AaB (1 August 2007) / Lyngby 1–6 Esbjerg (20 August 2007)
Most Goals in a Match: AGF 3–5 AaB (8 October 2007) / AaB 5–3 Lyngby (2 December 2007) / Nordsjælland 5–3 Viborg (27 April 2008)
First hat-trick of the season: Rajko Lekic for Esbjerg against Viborg (22 July 2007)

Cards
First yellow card: Robert Åhman-Persson for Viborg against Randers (18 July 2007)
First red card: Aílton José Almeida for Copenhagen against Viborg (28 August 2007)
 Fastest red card in a match: Atle Roar Håland (7 seconds) for OB against Horsens (11 May 2008)

Attendances

Goals

Top goalscorers

7 goals
AaB: Andreas Johansson
Brøndby IF: Martin Ericsson, Morten "Duncan" Rasmussen
Esbjerg fB: Njogu Demba-Nyrén, Søren Rieks, Martin Vingaard
FC Nordsjælland: Issey Nakajima-Farran
OB: Baye Djiby Fall
Randers FC: Bedi Buval, Thomas Dalgaard

6 goals
AaB: Siyabonga Nomvethe
Esbjerg fB: Jesper Lange, Rajko Lekic, Michaël Murcy
FC Nordsjælland: Bajram Fetai, Thomas Kristensen
OB: Jonas Borring
Randers FC: Marc Nygaard, Tidiane Sane

5 goals
AaB: Kasper Risgård
AGF: Dioh Williams
Brøndby IF: Stefán Gíslason, Chris Katongo
Esbjerg fB: Jesper Bech
F.C. Copenhagen: Libor Sionko
FC Midtjylland: Mikkel Thygesen
OB: Johan Absalonsen
Viborg FF: Christian Muomaife

Hat-tricks

Kits 2007–2008

Stadiums

Managerial changes

Promoted teams
The following teams were promoted to the Superliga at the end of last season:

 Lyngby BK (Winners of the 1st Division)
 AGF (Runners-up in the 1st Division)

Relegated teams
The following teams were relegated from the Superliga last season:

 Vejle B (Won 2–1 away to AC Horsens on May 24, 2007, but Viborg won also.)
 Silkeborg IF (Drew 1–1 with FC Nordsjælland on May 20, 2007 when they needed a win.)

Footnotes and references

See also
2007-08 in Danish football
Sports in Denmark

External links
  SAS Ligaen 2007–08 at the Danish FA
  Netsuperligaen.dk (unofficial site)
  SAS Ligaen 2007–08 at Haslund.info

Danish Superliga seasons
1
Denmark